Main is an 'L' station on the CTA's Purple Line at 836 Chicago Avenue in Evanston, Illinois (directional coordinates 900 north, 732 west). It is near the Main Street station of Metra's Union Pacific / North Line.

The current station has been in place since 1908, with only little renovation to the station since then, most notably a 90-foot extension of the platform in 1997 so that a motorman in the front car could see all doors stopped at the station (the platform had curved at one end previously).  Main is one of the stations on the CTA's 2004-2008 Capital Improvement Plan.

Bus and rail connections
CTA
206 Evanston Circulator (school days only)
Pace
213 Green Bay Road (Monday–Saturday only)
Metra
Evanston Main Street

Notes and references

Notes

References

External links 

 Train schedule (PDF) at CTA official site
 Main Street (Evanston Line) Station Page
 Main Street Station Page CTA official site
 Main Street Station Chicago Avenue entrance from Google Maps Street View

CTA Purple Line stations
Railway stations in Evanston, Illinois
Railway stations in the United States opened in 1908
1908 establishments in Illinois